Going Places (stylized as !!Going Places!!) is the fifth album by Herb Alpert and the Tijuana Brass. It was originally released by A&M Records in 1965 and has appeared in many formats.

Background
The group's title reverted to its original name for this album; its second, third and fourth albums had been released as Herb Alpert's Tijuana Brass. While the first four Tijuana Brass albums were recorded by Alpert backed by studio musicians, demands for live appearances dictated that Alpert assemble an actual touring band. The songs on Going Places are a mixture of sessions featuring Alpert's touring band and those with other session musicians, according to the liner notes in the Shout!Factory CD release.

The single version of "Tijuana Taxi" features more of the bicycle-horn sound effects than does the album version. "Tijuana Taxi" and "Spanish Flea" were included as part of the "Carmen" medley on the Herb Alpert's Ninth album. The B-side of the "Taxi" single, "Zorba the Greek", was edited for length and was augmented by live-concert sound effects.

"A Walk in the Black Forest" was a cover of a better-known version of the song that same year by Horst Jankowski. Two years later, the song was featured as the theme of a short-lived game show, Reach for the Stars. The Piggly Wiggly supermarket chain also used it as a theme for its TV commercials. The song "Spanish Flea", composed by Alpert's friend and fellow mariachi band leader Julius Wechter, was one of several Brass tunes heard regularly on The Dating Game.

The album was released in many formats, such as vinyl, 8-track, cassette, open reel and eventually CD. It was reissued in 2005 by the Shout!Factory label as part of the Herb Alpert Signature Series.

Critical reception

In the 21st century, Allmusic, music critic Richard S. Ginell wrote, "this album captures them at the peak of their exuberance.... No other TJB record has as much unbuttoned fun and humor as this one—-and not surprisingly, it spent six weeks at number one in 1966."

Track listing
LP
Side 1
"Tijuana Taxi" (Ervan Coleman)  – 2:05
"I'm Getting Sentimental Over You" (George Bassman)  – 1:59
"More And More Amor" (Sol Lake)  – 2:44
"Spanish Flea" (Julius Wechter)  – 2:07
"Mae" (Riz Ortolani)  – 2:27
"3rd Man Theme" (Anton Karas)  – 2:28

Side 2
"Walk, Don't Run" (Johnny Smith)  – 1:50
"Felicia" (John Pisano)  – 2:45
"And the Angels Sing" (Johnny Mercer, Ziggy Elman)  – 2:34
"Cinco De Mayo" (Chris Montez)  – 2:15
"A Walk In The Black Forest" (Horst Jankowski)  – 1:48
"Zorba The Greek" (Mikis Theodorakis)  – 4:25

Reel-to-reel tape
The album was issued twice on open-reel tape, the first edition (AMB-112, distributed by Ampex on behalf of A&M Records) presents the tracks in the same order as the LP. Because of the running-time differences, Side A includes a significant blank space at the beginning of the program, which allowed for a shorter break at the side change. In 1968, A&M reissued the open-reel tape (OR-4112) with an altered track sequence to balance the running times of the two sides.

 First reel-to-reel tape
Side 1
"Tijuana Taxi" – 2:05
"I'm Getting Sentimental Over You" – 1:59
"More And More Amor" – 2:44
"Spanish Flea" – 2:07
"Mae" – 2:27
"The Third Man Theme" – 2:28

Side 2
"Walk, Don't Run" – 1:50
"Felicia" – 2:45
"And the Angels Sing" – 2:34
"Cinco De Mayo" – 2:15
"A Walk In The Black Forest" – 1:48
"Zorba The Greek" – 4:25

 Second reel-to-reel tape
Side 1
"Tijuana Taxi" – 2:05
"Walk, Don't Run" – 1:50
"Spanish Flea" – 2:07
"More And More Amor" – 2:44
"A Walk In The Black Forest" – 1:48
"Zorba The Greek" – 4:25

Side 2
"Mae" – 2:27
"Cinco De Mayo" – 2:15
"Felicia" – 2:45
"I'm Getting Sentimental Over You" – 1:59
"And the Angels Sing" – 2:34
"The Third Man Theme" – 2:28

In popular culture
"Tijuana Taxi" was featured in the "On a Clear Day I Can't See My Sister" episode of Fox's animated series The Simpsons, the third episode ("Becoming Mr. Playboy") of the Amazon original series American Playboy: The Hugh Hefner Story and the "Tube Stakes" episode of the comedy series King of Queens (Season 2, Episode 5). The song was also used in KCET's Kids Club birthday promo on PBS Kids. It has also been used as the run-out music for Leyton Orient F C since the 1980s.

Chart positions

References

1965 albums
Herb Alpert albums
A&M Records albums
Albums produced by Herb Alpert
Albums produced by Jerry Moss
Albums recorded at Gold Star Studios